James Oscar Murray  (January 16, 1878 – April 25, 1945), was a Major League Baseball outfielder from 1902–1914.

External links 

1878 births
1945 deaths
Major League Baseball outfielders
Baseball players from Texas
Chicago Orphans players
St. Louis Browns players
Boston Braves players
Galveston Sandcrabs players
Shreveport Grays players
Houston Buffaloes players
San Antonio Bronchos players
Portsmouth Boers players
Toronto Maple Leafs (International League) players
Buffalo Bisons (minor league) players
Harrisburg Senators players
St. Paul Saints (AA) players
St. Paul Apostles players
Little Rock Travelers players
Galveston Pirates players
Oklahoma City Senators players
Oklahoma City Boosters players